John Irvine may refer to:

John Irvine (journalist), Northern Irish ITN journalist
John Irvine (priest) (born 1949), Dean of Coventry based at Coventry Cathedral, UK
John J. Irvine (1852–?), railroad worker, engineer, and politician in Chattanooga, Tennessee
Jack Irvine (John Alfred Irvine, 1912–1996), Canadian politician
John Irvine (ji_2001) DJ based in Edinburgh, Scotland

See also
John Irvin (born 1940), English film director
John Irvine Hunter (1898–1924), Australian professor of anatomy